Louis Hechenbleikner (October 29, 1893 – August 16, 1983) was an American painter. His work was part of the painting event in the art competition at the 1932 Summer Olympics.

References

1893 births
1983 deaths
20th-century American painters
American male painters
Olympic competitors in art competitions
Artists from Innsbruck
20th-century American male artists